Israel Reichert (Hebrew: ישראל רייכרט) (5 August 1891 – 22 May 1975) was a Polish-born Israeli agriculturist and biologist who established the field of phytopathology in Israel. He worked on the management of rusts and smuts of field and fruit crops.

Biography 
Israel Reichert was born in Ozorkow, Poland to Eliezer Chaim Layzer and Ruchama Reichert. He immigrated to what was then Ottoman Palestine in 1908. He worked as a labourer and then taught natural history. He studied botany at the University of Berlin under Adolf Engler, writing his thesis on the fungi of Egypt.

Scientific career
He applied biogeographical principles to fungi and worked on the management of plant pathogenic fungi. He worked in Italy briefly in 1921 and then moved back to Palestine to start a department of plant pathology. In 1942 he moved to the Hebrew University's School of Agriculture at Rehovot. He served as a professor from 1949 to 1959, co-founding the Palestine Journal of Botany in 1938.

Awards and recognition 
 In 1955, Reichert was awarded the Israel Prize, for the life sciences.

References

See also 
List of Israel Prize recipients

Academic staff of the Hebrew University of Jerusalem
Israel Prize in life sciences recipients
Israel Prize in life sciences recipients who were agriculturists
Israeli biologists
Emigrants from the Russian Empire to the Ottoman Empire
Jews in Mandatory Palestine
Israeli Jews
1891 births
1975 deaths
20th-century biologists